The Goya Museum (in French: Musée Goya) is an art museum located in Castres, France. The museum was originally established in 1840 and is named after the Spanish painter Francisco Goya.

The museum  is located in the old Bishop's Palace, which was built in 1675 and is based on the design of Jules Hardouin Mansart, who was an architect of the Palace of Versailles.
The gardens were designed by André Le Nôtre, who also worked at Versailles.

References

See also 
 Museo Goya - Colección Ibercaja - Museo Camón Aznar, an art museum in Zaragoza, Spain.

External links 

 Goya Museum — Castres, France, The Techno-Impressionist Journal: A year in the life…, 20 October 2006.

Buildings and structures completed in 1675
Art museums established in 1840
Art museums and galleries in France
Spanish art
Buildings and structures in Tarn (department)
Gardens in Tarn (department)
Francisco Goya
Episcopal palaces
Museums in Tarn (department)
1840 establishments in France